Belgium was represented by Jill Van Vooren and Lauren De Ruyck in the Junior Eurovision Song Contest 2010 with the song "Get Up!".

Jill & Lauren will compete for Belgium at the Junior Eurovision Song Contest 2010, to be held on 20 November in Minsk, Belarus.

Before Eurovision

Junior Eurosong 
Belgium selected their Junior Eurovision Song Contest entry for 2010 through Junior Eurosong, a national selection consisting of 8 songs. 

Before the final, four semi-finals were held with two songs each. A five-member jury panel consisting of Walter Grootaers, Jelle Van Dael, Stan Van Samang, Ralf Mackenbach (Dutch representative at the Junior Eurovision Song Contest 2009) alongside one guest juror in each semi-final selected the winning entry of each semi-final to qualify for the final. In the final, the winner was selected via a 50/50 combination of jury voting and public televoting.

Semi-final 1
The first semi-final took place on 27 September 2010. Two of the competing entries performed, and the five-member jury panel selected the winning entry to qualify for the final. The guest juror was Laura Omloop (Belgian representative at the Junior Eurovision Song Contest 2009).

Semi-final 2
The second semi-final took place on 28 September 2010. Two of the competing entries performed, and the five-member jury panel selected the winning entry to qualify for the final. The guest juror was Eva Storme (Belgian representative at the Junior Eurovision Song Contest 2007).

Semifinal 3
The third semi-final took place on 29 September 2010. Two of the competing entries performed, and a five-member jury panel selected the winning entry to qualify for the final. The guest juror was Laura Omloop (Belgian representative at the Junior Eurovision Song Contest 2009).

Semifinal 4
The fourth semi-final took place on 30 September 2010. Two of the competing entries performed, and a five-member jury panel selected the winning entry to qualify for the final. The guest juror was Thor Salden (Belgian representative at the Junior Eurovision Song Contest 2006).

Final
The final took place on 1 October 2010. The winner was selected via a 50/50 combination of jury voting and public televoting. The jury panel that voted in the final consisting of Walter Grootaers, Jelle Van Dael, Stan Van Samang, Ralf Mackenbach, Laura Omloop, Eva Storme and Thor Salden.

At Junior Eurovision

Voting

Notes

References

External links
 Belgium's page at JuniorEurovision.tv

Junior Eurovision Song Contest
Belgium
2010